Franklin Aretas Haskell (July 13, 1828June 3, 1864) was a Union Army officer during the American Civil War and was killed at the Battle of Cold Harbor.  Haskell wrote a famous account of the Battle of Gettysburg that was published posthumously.

Early life
Haskell was born at Tunbridge, Vermont, to Aretas and Anna E. Folsom Haskell. He moved to Wisconsin to study law in the office of his brother Harrison. He graduated from Dartmouth College in 1854, and returned to Madison, Wisconsin, to practice law. During this period, Haskell became the drill master of a militia company.

Civil War
When the Civil War began, Haskell enlisted in Col. Lysander Cutler's 6th Wisconsin Infantry of Brig. Gen. Rufus King's Brigade. This brigade would eventually be known as the Iron Brigade. He served as adjutant for the regiment with the rank of first lieutenant until April 1862, when he was made aide-de-camp for Brig. Gen. John Gibbon, the new Commander of the Iron Brigade. While with the Iron Brigade, Haskell saw action during the Northern Virginia Campaign and the Maryland Campaign. When Gibbon was promoted to command of the 2nd Division, I Corps, Haskell went with him and remained his aide. This division saw action at the Battle of Fredericksburg. After Gibbon suffered a wound at Fredericksburg, he took time off to recuperate and had been replaced in command of his division. He was given command of the 2nd Division, II Corps and again Haskell remained his aide. This division saw action during the Chancellorsville Campaign.

Gettysburg
Gibbon's Division headed north toward Pennsylvania during the Gettysburg Campaign and was in Taneytown, Maryland, when the Battle of Gettysburg began. Gibbon was given temporary command of II Corps after I Corps Commander Maj. Gen. John F. Reynolds was killed and Maj. Gen. George G. Meade ordered II Corps Commander Maj. Gen. Winfield S. Hancock to Gettysburg to assume command. Haskell and II Corps did not arrive on the battlefield until July 2, 1863. There they took part in the defense of Cemetery Ridge, the area around the Nicholas Codori Farm, and supported III Corps, commanded by Daniel E. Sickles, in their defense of the Peach Orchard. In his recollections of the Battle, Haskell was highly critical of Sickles as a soldier and a person as well as his move forward that led to his III Corps being attacked by the Confederates. 

That night, Gibbon took part in a council of war called by Meade which Haskell recorded in his recollections of the Battle. On July 3, Gibbon was back in command of his division and Haskell was by his side. Late that morning, Gibbon hosted a meal for much of the Union high command which Haskell also recorded for posterity. Shortly after the luncheon broke up Confederate artillery began to shell the area where Gibbon's men were positioned. Gibbon's position bore the brunt of the Confederate attack known as Pickett's Charge. Haskell rallied Gibbon's men after the Confederates had breached the stone wall and Gibbon had been wounded. Hancock, Gibbon, Brig. Gen.William Harrow, Col. Norman J. Hall, and Col. A.F. Devereux (19th Mass.) commended Haskell for his performance, with Gibbon later writing that "I have always thought that to him, more than to any one man, are we indebted for the repulse of Lee's assault."

A few weeks after the Battle, Haskell wrote the account of what he had experienced at Gettysburg to his brother Harrison in Portage, Wisconsin. At the time, Harrison could not even get a newspaper to publish the account. Haskell's account would be published in 1898 as a book called The Battle of Gettysburg. This account was hailed by Bruce Catton as "One of the genuine classics of Civil War literature."

Gibbon and Haskell returned to Gettysburg in November 1863 to attend the dedication of the Soldiers' National Cemetery and witnessed President Abraham Lincoln's Gettysburg Address after recreating their role in the battle for some tourists on Cemetery Ridge.

Death
On February 9, 1864, Haskell was appointed colonel of the 36th Wisconsin Infantry Regiment. On June 3, he assumed command of the 1st Brigade, 2nd Division, II Corps when its commander Col. Henry Boyd McKeen was killed during the Battle of Cold Harbor. Shortly after taking command he was shot through the temple and killed while leading a charge. A distraught Gibbon cried out: "My God! I have lost my best friend, and one of the best soldiers in the Army of the Potomac has fallen!" Gibbon wrote to his wife that he had planned to promote "poor Haskell" to field command after the battle.

Haskell's Battle of Gettysburg in popular culture
Haskell's account is reprinted in volume 43, "American Historical Documents", of The Harvard Classics.

In The Killer Angels, the novel by Michael Shaara, part 4 ("Friday, July 3, 1863"), chapter 3 ("Chamberlain"), Col. Joshua Lawrence Chamberlain goes to see Gen. Sykes, his corps commander, where there is a lunch for the senior commanders, and is finally taken some chicken by Lt. Haskell himself. That lunch is from Haskell's account.

In The Civil War, the documentary by Ken Burns, the subtitle of Episode 5, "The Universe of Battle", comes from Haskell's account, where, shortly after the lunch, he and Gen. Gibbon are sitting, watching the great cannonade of the third day. During "Gettysburg: The Third Day", Garrison Keillor reads a relevant excerpt.

Notes

References
 Byrne, Frank L. and Andrew T. Weaver, Haskell of Gettysburg, The Kent State University Press, 1989.
 Gaff, Alan D., On Many a Bloody Field: Four Years in the Iron Brigade, Bloomington, Indiana: Indiana University Press, 1999, .
 Gibbon, John. Personal Recollections of the Civil War. New York : G.P. Putnam's Sons, 1928.
 Haskell, Frank A. The Battle of Gettysburg, Military Order of the Loyal Legion of the United States Commandery of the State of Massachusetts, 1908.
 Haskell, Frank A. The Battle of Gettysburg, edited by Bruce Catton, Houghton, Mifflin Company, 1958.
 Lavery, Dennis S. and Mark H. Jordan, Iron Brigade General: John Gibbon, Rebel in Blue, Greenwood Press, 2003, .
 Martin, David G. Gettysburg: July 1, Da Capo Press, 2003, 
 Nolan, Alan T., The Iron Brigade, A Military History, Indiana University Press, 1961, .

External links

 
 

1828 births
1864 deaths
Union Army officers
Union military personnel killed in the American Civil War
People of Wisconsin in the American Civil War
People of Vermont in the American Civil War
Dartmouth College alumni
People from Tunbridge, Vermont
Military personnel from Madison, Wisconsin
Iron Brigade
Writers from Vermont
Writers from Madison, Wisconsin